The 2019–20 season was the 37th season in Segunda División played by Real Oviedo, a Spanish football club based in Oviedo, Asturias. It covered a period from 1 July 2019 to 30 June 2020. It was extended extraordinarily beyond 30 June due to the COVID-19 pandemic in Spain.

Squad information

First team squad

Reserve team

Technical Staff

Managerial changes

Transfers

In

Out

Pre-season and friendlies

Competitions

Segunda División

Results summary

Results by round

Matches

Copa del Rey

First round

References

External links 

Real Oviedo
Real Oviedo seasons